Grampian is a borough in Clearfield County, Pennsylvania, United States. The population was 361 as of the 2020 census.

The community was named after the Grampian Mountains, in Scotland, the ancestral home of an early settler.

Geography
Grampian is located in western Clearfield County at  (40.965240, -78.611294). U.S. Route 219 passes through the borough, leading northwest  to DuBois and southwest  to Mahaffey.

Water supply
The town of Grampian is the remnants of a booming coal industry. The town had reached such sustainable population that a municipal water supply was incorporated. The water supply is piped from Curwensville and then dispersed into several water tanks for community use. The water authority board handles budgets, grants and hiring of licensed technicians. Grampian/Penn Township Water Authority employs one full-time licensed technician to run day-to-day operations.

Demographics

As of the census of 2000, there were 441 people, 166 households, and 119 families residing in the borough. The population density was 1,486.0 people per square mile (567.6/km2). There were 177 housing units at an average density of 596.4 per square mile (227.8/km2). The racial makeup of the borough was 99.77% White, 0.23% from other races. Hispanic or Latino of any race were 0.68% of the population.

There were 166 households, out of which 42.2% had children under the age of 18 living with them, 56.6% were married couples living together, 10.8% had a female householder with no husband present, and 28.3% were non-families. 24.7% of all households were made up of individuals, and 10.8% had someone living alone who was 65 years of age or older. The average household size was 2.66 and the average family size was 3.14.

In the borough the population was spread out, with 31.3% under the age of 18, 7.5% from 18 to 24, 29.5% from 25 to 44, 17.5% from 45 to 64, and 14.3% who were 65 years of age or older. The median age was 31 years. For every 100 females there were 94.3 males. For every 100 females age 18 and over, there were 88.2 males.

The median income for a household in the borough was $29,271, and the median income for a family was $34,219. Males had a median income of $26,528 versus $20,179 for females. The per capita income for the borough was $12,127. About 6.2% of families and 8.4% of the population were below the poverty line, including 14.8% of those under age 18 and none of those age 65 or over.

Notable person
Lloyd H. Wood, 20th Lieutenant Governor of Pennsylvania

See also
Western Pennsylvania
Bilger's Rocks

References

Populated places established in 1805
Boroughs in Clearfield County, Pennsylvania
1885 establishments in Pennsylvania